Heloísa Perlingeiro Périssé (born 9 August 1966) is a Brazilian actress and writer.

Biography
Périssé was born in Rio de Janeiro and has appeared in Brazilian television shows and films. She has also written for the TV show Sai de Baixo.

Périssé has also written books including, Mãe, Você Não Tá Entendendo and O Diário de Tati.

She has been a daughter-in-law of Chico Anysio. She divorced Lug de Paula, Chico Anysio's son, after a seven-year marriage.

She has two daughters: Antônia and Luiza.

Filmography

Television 
 1994 - Incidente em Antares - Marfissa
 1994 - Escolinha do Professor Raimundo - Tati / Soledade 
 1995 - Você Decide - Cíntia
 1996 - Chico Total - Various roles
 1999 - Zorra Total - Malu
 2000 - Brava Gente - Dirce
 2000 - Os Normais - Kátia
 2002 - Fantástico - Tati
 2003 - Sob Nova Direção - Belinha 
 2008 - Fantástico - Lolô
 2009 - Cama de Gato - Taís
 2010 - Os Caras de Pau - Tati
 2010 - O Relógio da Aventura - Regina / Lívia
 2011 - Cordel Encantado - Neuza
 2012 - Dercy de Verdade - Dercy Gonçalves (young)
 2012 - Avenida Brasil - Monalisa Barbosa
 2013 - Junto & Misturado - Heloísa
 2014 - Segunda Dama - Marali/Analu
 2014 - Boogie Oogie - Beatriz
 2016 - A Lei do Amor - Mileide
 2022 - The Masked Singer Brasil - Coxinha

Film 
 2002 - Avassaladoras - Receptionist Honeymoon
 2002 - Lara - Cinira
 2003 - Lisbela e o Prisioneiro - Prazeres
 2003 - Xuxa Abracadabra - Patrícia
 2004 - Sexo, Amor e Traição - Cláudia
 2005 - Madagascar - Gloria (Brazilian voice dubbing)
 2007 - Tati, o Filme - Tati
 2007 - Os Porralokinhas - Escarlete
 2008 - Madagascar: Escape 2 Africa - Gloria (Brazilian voice dubbing)
 2010 - Muita Calma Nessa Hora - Esoteric woman
 2012 - Madagascar 3: Europe's Most Wanted - Gloria (Brazilian voice dubbing)
 2012 - O Diário de Tati - Tati
 2013 - Odeio o Dia dos Namorados - Débora
 2014 - Muita Calma Nessa Hora 2 - Esotérica

References

External links

 Official Website

1966 births
Living people
Actresses from Rio de Janeiro (city)
Brazilian people of Swiss descent
Brazilian people of French descent
Brazilian telenovela actresses
Brazilian film actresses
Brazilian voice actresses
Brazilian Presbyterians